Joyce Hoffman (born 1946/47) is an American surfer, considered a pioneer in her sport. She is often regarded as the first female international surfing star and was one of the first inductees of the International Surfing Hall of Fame. In 1968 she became the first woman to surf the Banzai Pipeline in Hawaii.

Born in Dana Point, California, Hoffman started competing at an early age. She went on to win numerous honors including the US Surfing Championship for Women from 1965–67 and 1971, and the Makaha International Open in 1964 and 1966. In 1965, she was named LA Times Woman of the Year, making her the only surfer to ever win this honor. Also that year she won the U.S. Women's championship (held in Huntington Beach), the World Championship (held in Lima, Peru) and the International Women's Surfing Championship (held in Makaha).

In 1966 she was voted best woman surfer in the world by the International Surfing Hall of Fame. Hoffman was also the top vote getter for Surfing Magazine International Hall of Fame Awards in 1966 and 1967. In 1994 she was inducted into the Surfing Walk of Fame as that year's Woman of the Year; the Walk is in Huntington Beach, California. There is a life-size statue and mural in Dana Point honoring Hoffman.

She has also been a leading female motocross rider.

Hoffman appeared as herself in the June 28, 1965 episode of To Tell the Truth, receiving two of the four possible votes.

References
Andrea Gabbard (2000) Girl In The Curl: A Century of Women in Surfing. Seal Press.

External links
Joyce Hoffman at Encyclopedia of Surfing

American surfers
American female surfers
Living people
1940s births
21st-century American women